Yousufguda is a neighbourhood in Hyderabad, Telangana, India. It is a major residential suburb.

Due to its proximity to the IT hub near Madhapur, it has become a more affordable alternative to other areas in the vicinity such as Jubilee Hills, Gachibowli, and Sri Nagar Colony.

The Andhra Pradesh Special Police, First Battalion campus is located here.

Commercial area
There are many shops which cater to all budgets. It has many shopping malls like Reliance Fresh, Ratnadeep, Heritage Fresh, ValueMart and More.

The neighbourhood has an eSeva Centre, a service provided for paying bills and other government services.

There are many banks which have their branches here such as State Bank of India, State Bank of Hyderabad, HDFC Bank, ICICI, Allahabad Bank, and Canara Bank.

Transport
TSRTC connects Yousufguda to all parts of the city.

The closest MMTS Train station is at Begumpet, Borabanda or HITEC City.

Sports
It also has indoor stadium named Kotla Vijay Bhaskar Reddy Indoor Stadium and Krishna Kanth Park.

References

Neighbourhoods in Hyderabad, India